Piletocera melesalis is a moth in the family Crambidae. It was described by Francis Walker in 1859. It is found on Borneo.

References

melesalis
Endemic fauna of Borneo
Moths of Borneo
Moths described in 1859